The Nightcaps were an American rock and roll band formed in Dallas, Texas, in 1958 and were active, in varying lineups, until 2009.  They became one of the most popular bands in Dallas and scored regional hits in the early 1960s with "Wine, Wine, Wine" and "Thunderbird", which was later recorded by ZZ Top.  The songs gained the group notoriety outside of their own region, and during the 1960s they toured in other parts of the country, particularly around the South.  The group was a forerunner for many of the Dallas garage bands of the era and their raunchy, blues-based sound influenced artists such as Jimmie Vaughan and Stevie Ray Vaughan.  In 2009, they were honored for their accomplishments by the Texas Senate.

History 

The Nightcaps were formed by Billy Joe Shine in Dallas, Texas in 1958.  Their original lineup consisted of Shine on lead vocals, Gene Haufler on rhythm guitar, David Swartz on lead guitar, Mario Daboub on bass, and Jack Allday on drums.  At the time, all of the band members were high school students.  They began by playing sock hops and school dances, and playing R&B covers, but also began writing songs, usually written by Shine.  They secured frequent gigs in the Dallas area and were often paid from $50–200 a night.  They were noticed by local entrepreneur Tom Brown, who initially attempted to have them signed to RCA Victor, but then signed them to his own local Vandan label.

The Nightcaps' recorded their debut single featuring two songs written by Shine, "Wine Wine Wine" b/w "Nightcap Rock".  According to Shine, he wrote "Wine, Wine, Wine" during a school study hall following a class where the students had been taught that Jesus turned water into wine.  The song became a hit in Dallas and received airplay in other parts of the country.  The group got offers to play far beyond Dallas.  Their second single "Thunderbird" b/w "Ole Jose," released in 1961, was also a hit in Dallas.  The group recorded the album, Wine, Wine, Wine, which was released that year, and featured a mixture of rockabilly, blues, and instrumental tracks.  The instrumental, "Tough That's All" showcased David Schwartz' lead guitar playing.  Also appearing on the album was jazz saxophone player, John Hardee, credited under the name John Hardtimes.  Though the album did not crack the national charts, it got pirated around the country and made it possible for the Nightcaps to get bookings across the south.

The British Invasion, though it presented a challenge, did not prevent the band from remaining popular as a live act well into the 1960s.  The group went through several lineup changes.  Gary Mears of the Original Casuals, another Dallas band, briefly joined.  During this period, they became a major influence on musicians such as Jimmie Vaughan, and his younger brother, Stevie Ray Vaughan, as well as future members of ZZ Top, whose later use of the song "Thunderbird" (credited to themselves) would become the source of legal controversy.  Vaughan later recorded "Thunderbird," and ZZ Top chose it to open their Fandango album.  Eventually advancing maturity, marriage and general weariness led most of the members into regular jobs and professions.  Billy Joe Shine became a furniture manufacturing representative, but was still fronting a version of the Nightcaps on weekends in the 1990s, and he remained a popular musical figure in and around Dallas for many years.  In 2009, the Nightcaps were honored by the Texas Senate.  Leader Billy Joe Shine died in March 2015.

Personnel 

Billy Joe Shine (lead vocals; died 2015, age 75)
Gene Haufler (rhythm guitar; died 2017, age 76)
David Swartz (lead guitar; died 2014, age 73)
Mario Daboub (bass; died 2015, age 74)
Jack Allday (drums)

Discography 
Singles

"Wine Wine Wine" b/w "Nightcap Rock" (Vandan, 1959)
"Thunderbird" b/w "Ole Jose"  (Vandan, 1960)
"24 Hours" b/w "No Parking"  (Vandan, 1960)
"Wine Wine Wine No. 2"  b/w "Walking The Dog"  (Vandan, 1963)

Album

"Wine Wine Wine" (Vandan, 1961)

References 

Garage rock groups from Texas
Musical groups established in 1958
Rock and roll music groups
1958 establishments in Texas